Symmetrical drug-related intertriginous and flexural exanthema (SDRIFE), more popularly known as baboon syndrome because of its resemblance to the distinctive red buttocks displayed by female baboons, is a systemic dermatitis characterized by well-demarcated patches of erythema distributed symmetrically on the buttocks.
The cause of the syndrome may be drug-related, i.e. induced by systemic administration of hydroxyzine penicillin, iodinated radio contrast media and others.

Symptoms and signs 
The typical rash commonly appears on buttocks. This then resembles the colour of a baboon's buttocks. Other areas like upper inner thigh and armpits, may be affected by the rash. The rashes are red and well-defined.  The presentation is typically symmetrical and not associated with systemic symptoms.

Cause

Diagnosis

Treatment
Treatment of symmetrical drug related intertriginous and flexural exanthema involves identifying and stopping the causative agent. Topical steroids can help to reduce the redness.

Epidemiology 
Baboon syndrome affects both sexes equally, and can occur at any age, but seems to be more common in childhood than in adulthood.

See also 
 Airbag dermatitis
 List of cutaneous conditions

References 

Contact dermatitis
Syndromes affecting the skin